Anna Gabriella Ceccatelli, known as Gabriella (1 December 1927 – 21 February 2001), was an Italian politician.

Biography 
Ceccatelli was born in Prato, Tuscany on December 1, 1927.

Ceccatelli was also a Senator between 1983 and 1992 for the Christian Democracy party. During this period she was the undersecretary of the environmental ministry in the Giovanni Goria and De Mita governments from 1987 to 1989. She also had close ties to Catholic associations. She would serve as National Secretary of the Women's Movement of Christian Democracy.

She died in Rome on February 21, 2001.

External links 

 Italian Senate Page
 Italian Parliament Page

References

1927 births
2001 deaths
People from Prato
21st-century Italian women politicians
Christian Democracy (Italy) politicians
Senators of Legislature IX of Italy
Senators of Legislature X of Italy
20th-century Italian women
Women members of the Senate of the Republic (Italy)